Olšany Cemeteries (Olšanské hřbitovy in Czech, Wolschan in German) is the largest graveyard in Prague, Czech Republic, once laid out for as many as two million burials. The graveyard is particularly noted for its many remarkable art nouveau monuments.

History 

The Olšany Cemeteries were created in 1680 to accommodate plague victims who died en masse in Prague and needed to be buried quickly. In 1787, when the plague again struck the city, Emperor Joseph II banned the burial of bodies within Prague city limits and Olšany Cemeteries were declared the central graveyard for hygiene purposes.

The Olšany necropolis consists of twelve cemeteries, including an Orthodox and a tiny Muslim section, the largest Jewish cemetery in the Czech Republic and military burial grounds. Among the thousands of military personnel buried at Olšany, there are Russian soldiers and officers from the Napoleonic Wars, members of the Czechoslovak Legion, Czechoslovak soldiers, officers and pilots who fought at the Eastern and Western Front and in North Africa during the Second World War as well as male and female members of the Soviet and Commonwealth (including British, Canadian, South African, Greek and Turkish Cypriot and Polish) armed forces who died for the freedom of Czechoslovakia in 1944–1945, including POWs. Based on a bilateral agreement, Czech authorities are responsible for the protection of Russian and Soviet military graves at the Czech territory (as the Russian Federation is responsible for protecting Czechoslovak war graves from both World Wars in Russia). The Commonwealth Prague War Cemetery, including 256 graves, was established under the terms of the 1949 War Graves Agreement between the UK and Czechoslovakia and is maintained by the Commonwealth War Graves Commission. 

There are two ceremonial halls assigned to bid farewell to the deceased; the newer one is located in a building of the Prague's first crematorium. New to the scene is the "Olšany Cemeteries Learning Trail" which is so far mapping the history of three of the oldest sections, also sketching the life stories of some celebrities buried here. Prague's Olšany cemeteries excel in their picturesque style and tranquil nooks, surpassing even Malostranský cemetery and Slavín, being the biggest necropolis in the Czech Republic.

Till this day there is evidence of 230,000 people buried, 65,000 grave sites, 200 chapel graves and six columbariums in Olšany Cemeteries.

Part of the movie Bad Company was filmed in Olšany Cemeteries.

Famous burials

Many well-known people are buried at Olšany Cemeteries, including:

Writers, artists, and actors
 Bernard Bolzano (1781–1848), mathematician
 Karel Havlíček Borovský (1821–1856), writer
 Jaroslav Čermák (1831–1878), painter
 Viktor Dyk (1877–1931), writer and conservative politician
 Karel Jaromír Erben (1811–1870), writer
 Rudolf Hrušínský (1920–1994), actor
 Václav Kliment Klicpera (1792–1859), playwright
 Ján Kollár (1793–1852), Slovak Lutheran pastor, philologist and writer
 Josef Lada (1887–1957), artist and writer
 Viktor Oliva (1861–1928), artist
 Ossi Oswalda (1897–1947), German actress in silent film    
 Jan Rejsa (1886–1971), artist, editor, and writer
 Pavel Jozef Šafárik (1795–1861), Slovak philologist and historian
 Antonín Slavíček (1870–1910), painter
 Ladislav Stroupežnický (1850–1892), playwright
 Jan Erazim Vocel (1803–1871), poet, archaeologist, historian and cultural revivalist
 Jiří Voskovec (1905–1981), actor and playwright
 Jan Werich (1905–1980), actor

Politicians
 Karel Kramář (1860–1937), politician and first Prime Minister of Czechoslovakia (November 1918 – July 1919) and his Russian wife Nadezhda (1862-1936) are buried in the crypt of the Dormition Church (Chrám Zesnutí přesvaté Bohorodice) in the Orthodox section of the cemetery
 Jan Syrový (1888–1970), general and Prime Minister of Czechoslovakia during the Munich Crisis (September–December 1938), as well as acting President following the resignation of Edvard Beneš
 Radola Gajda (1892–1948), military officer (and eventually general) with the Czechoslovak Legions in World War I and the Russian Civil War; later one of the founders of the fascist (yet anti-German) National Fascist Community and member of the Czechoslovakian Parliament
 Klement Gottwald (1896–1953), communist President of Czechoslovakia (1948–1953); his body was originally displayed in a mausoleum at the site of the Jan Žižka monument. In 1962 the body was cremated, the ashes returned to the Žižka Monument and placed in a sarcophagus. In 1990, Gottwald's ashes were moved to Olšany Cemetery, together with the ashes of about 20 other communist leaders which had also originally been placed in the Žižka Monument.
 Piotra Krecheuski (1879–1928), Belarusian statesman and president of the Rada of the Belarusian Democratic Republic in exile.
 Vasil Zacharka (1877–1943), Belarusian politician, activist, president of the Rada of the Belarusian Democratic Republic in exile.

Others
 Jan Palach (1948–1969), student who set himself on fire in Wenceslas Square (Prague) as a protest against the 1968 Warsaw Pact invasion of Czechoslovakia
 Pavel Roman (1943–1972), winner of four consecutive titles (1962, 1963, 1964, and 1965) in ice dancing at the World Figure Skating Championships with his sister Eva
 Jake Madden (1865–1948), Scottish footballer and later Manager of SK Slavia Praha for 25 years

References

External links 

 Cemetery details (in Czech)
 Olšany Cemetery (photo gallery)
 Transcripts of Headstones
 Photo gallery in 3-D
 CWGC: Prague (Olsany) Cemetery

17th-century establishments in Bohemia
1680 establishments in the Habsburg monarchy
Art Nouveau architecture in Prague
Art Nouveau cemeteries
Cemeteries in Prague
Commonwealth War Graves Commission cemeteries in the Czech Republic
National Cultural Monuments of the Czech Republic
Religion in Prague
Žižkov